Kim Tae-Young (born 14 September 1987) is a South Korean footballer who plays as midfielder for Bucheon FC 1995 in K League Challenge.

Career
In 2008, he joined S. League side Supre Reds for a living.

He moved to Bucheon FC 1995 in Challengers League in 2010. He was selected by Bucheon in the 2013 K League draft after his team decided to participate in the professional league K League Challenge.

References

External links 
 
 Profile at S-League Site

South Korean footballers
South Korean expatriate footballers
Living people
Association football midfielders
1987 births
Bucheon FC 1995 players
Singapore Premier League players
K3 League players
K League 2 players
Expatriate footballers in Singapore
South Korean expatriate sportspeople in Singapore